Michal Peškovič (born 8 February 1982 in Partizánske) is a Slovak professional footballer who plays as a goalkeeper.

Career
In the past he was a player of Tempo Partizánske, FC Nitra, OFK Veľký Lapáš, FC ViOn Zlaté Moravce and Polonia Bytom.

In January 2011, he joined Ruch Chorzów on a one-year contract.

In August 2015, Peškovič signed a six-month contract with Azerbaijan Premier League side Neftchi Baku.

On 3 November 2020, he rejoined Podbeskidzie Bielsko-Biała.

Personal life
His brother is Boris Peškovič, a former goalkeeper.

References

External links
 
 

1982 births
Living people
Slovak footballers
Association football goalkeepers
FC Nitra players
FC ViOn Zlaté Moravce players
Polonia Bytom players
Aris Thessaloniki F.C. players
Ruch Chorzów players
Viborg FF players
Podbeskidzie Bielsko-Biała players
Neftçi PFK players
Korona Kielce players
MKS Cracovia (football) players
Super League Greece players
Danish Superliga players
Azerbaijan Premier League players
Ekstraklasa players
I liga players
Expatriate footballers in Greece
Slovak expatriate sportspeople in Greece
Slovak expatriate sportspeople in Poland
Expatriate footballers in Poland
Slovak expatriate sportspeople in Denmark
Expatriate men's footballers in Denmark
Expatriate footballers in Azerbaijan
Slovak expatriate footballers
People from Partizánske
Sportspeople from the Trenčín Region